The Arab Jordan Investment Bank (AJIB) is a Jordanian bank established in Amman in 1978.

It serves in Jordan, Qatar and Cyprus. It opened its branch in Limassol - Cyprus, in 1989, and in 2006 its Qatari branch was established.

See also 

 List of banks in Jordan

References

External links 

 Official site (Adobe Flash)

Banks of Jordan
Companies based in Amman
Banks established in 1978
Jordanian brands
Companies listed on the Amman Stock Exchange